Alekos Flambouraris is a Greek politician who currently serves as the Minister of State for Coordinating Government Operations in the second Tsipras cabinet.

Political career 

Flambouraris "helped guide Mr Tsipras’ rise from student politician to prime minister," according to the Financial Times. Following the January 2015 legislative election, he was appointed as Minister of State for Coordinating Government Operations.

In the campaign for the September 2015 legislative election, Flambouraris was embroiled in a scandal surrounding his business interests. It was alleged by Greek news website, Proto Thema, that Flambouraris had maintained a majority shareholding in a technical services company, Diatmisi, in defiance of regulations banning cabinet members from owning or operating a business. Flambouraris denied any wrongdoing, but the scandal led to significant angst within Syriza. Dimitris Mardas said that "Ministers shouldn’t be involved in public sector deals... It’s an ethical issue."

Flambouraris was re-elected in the September 2015 legislative election, and was re-appointed in the second Tsipras cabinet.

References

Living people
Syriza politicians
Government ministers of Greece
Greek MPs 2015 (February–August)
Greek MPs 2015–2019
Year of birth missing (living people)
Politicians from Athens
Greek MPs 2019–2023